Jaspers Brush is a rural locality south of Berry, New South Wales in the City of Shoalhaven.

History
It was named by John Ingold after his brother Jasper who died in 1860 before he could leave England for Australia.

Railway 
Jaspers Brush railway station on the South Coast Railway was opened 2 June 1893 and was closed 11 Dec 1951.

Duplication 
Duplication of the tracks through Jaspers Brush is proposed to increase capacity for freight trains and to allow passenger services to be improved from hourly to half-hourly.

References 

South Coast (New South Wales)
City of Shoalhaven